Ach du lieber Harry is a German film directed by Jean Girault. It was released in 1981.

External links
 

1981 films
1981 comedy films
German comedy films
West German films
1980s German-language films
1980s German films